At the Organ is an EP by American rock band The Minus 5. Released on Yep Roc in 2004, the album features a lineup of Peter Buck from R.E.M., Ken Stringfellow from the Posies, Rebecca Gates from the Spinanes, and Wilco.

Track listing
"Lyrical Stance" (Peter Buck, Scott McCaughey, Jeff Tweedy) – 1:26
"Hotel Senator" (McCaughey) – 3:20
"Formerly Hail Centurion" (McCaughey, Tweedy) – 3:29
"Film of the Movie" (McCaughey) – 2:32
"The Town That Lost Its Groove Supply (Seattle Version)" (McCaughey) – 2:37
"Days of Wine and Booze (original)" (McCaughey) – 2:22
"One More Bottle to Go" (McCaughey, Tweedy) – 3:50
"The Town That Lost Its Groove Supply" (video clip)

Personnel

Musicians
Scott McCaughey - electric and acoustic guitar, vocals, rocksichord, mixing
Jeff Tweedy - guitars, synthesizer, vocals, drums
John Stirratt - organ, percussion
Glenn Kotche - drums, marimba, percussion
Leroy Bach - electric guitar, marimba
Peter Buck - bass, guitar
Mikael Jorgensen - celeste, Farfisa organ, producer, engineer
Rebecca Gates - vocals
John Ramberg - bass, lead and backing vocals
Bill Rieflin - drums
Ken Stringfellow - horn
John Moen - clapping, stomping
Jimmy Talent - bass

Production
Johnny Sangster, Eric Lovre - producers, engineers, mixing
Charlie Francis - mixing
Kurt Bloch - layout design, mixing, mastering 
Chris Mars - animation, artwork, video
Scott Ferril - video

References

2004 EPs
The Minus 5 EPs
Yep Roc Records EPs
Wilco
Albums produced by Johnny Sangster